Duke of Arjona is a hereditary title in the Peerage of Spain, accompanied by the dignity of Grandee and granted in 1423 by John II to Fadrique Enríquez de Castilla, Count of Trastámara and a great-grandchild of Alfonso XI.

It was rehabilitated by Alfonso XIII in 1902, in favour of Jacobo Fitz-James Stuart, 17th Duke of Alba, who was the heir of the House of Lemos, and by extension, of the Dukedom of Arjona, one of the oldest titles in Spain.

The title makes reference to the town of Arjona, in the Province of Jaén.

Dukes of Arjona (1423)

Fadrique Enríquez de Castilla, 1st Duke of Arjona
Jacobo Fitz-James Stuart y Falcó, 2nd Duke of Arjona
Cayetana Fitz-James Stuart y Silva, 3rd Duchess of Arjona
Cayetano Martínez de Irujo y Fitz-James Stuart, 4th Duke of Arjona

See also
Count of Salvatierra
List of dukes in the peerage of Spain
List of current Grandees of Spain

References 

Dukedoms of Spain
Grandees of Spain
Lists of dukes
Lists of Spanish nobility